A draper is a cloth merchant.

Draper or Drapers may also refer to:

Places

United States
 Draper, Kentucky
 Draper Village, North Carolina, now consolidated into Eden
 Draper, South Dakota
 Draper, Texas
 Draper, Utah
 Draper station (FrontRunner)
 Draper Town Center station
 Draper, Virginia
 Draper, Wisconsin
 Draper (community), Wisconsin
 Draper Island (Michigan)
 Lake Stanley Draper, a reservoir near Oklahoma City, Oklahoma

Elsewhere
 Draper, Alberta, Canada
 Draper, Queensland, Australia
 Draper railway station, Adelaide, Australia
 Draper (crater), on the Moon

Businesses and organisations
 Draper Corporation, former American power loom manufacturer
 Draper Correctional Facility, an Alabama state prison 1939–2018
 Draper Fisher Jurvetson, formerly Draper Associates, a venture capital firm
 Draper Richards, a venture capital firm
 Draper Laboratory, an American not-for-profit research and development organization
 Draper Tools, a British distributor of tools
 Worshipful Company of Drapers, a livery company of the City of London

Other uses
 Draper (surname), including a list of people and fictional characters with the name
 Drapers (magazine), a magazine for fashion retailers

See also

 Drapery, cloths or textiles